Kermia tippetti is a species of sea snail, a marine gastropod mollusk in the family Raphitomidae.

Description

Distribution
This marine species occurs off Taiwan

References

External links
 

tippetti
Gastropods described in 2001